The 1973–74 Houston Aeros season was the Houston Aeros second season of operation in the World Hockey Association (WHA). The season saw the debut of Gordie Howe and his sons in the WHA. The team would win the Avco World Trophy WHA championship.

Offseason

Regular season
At age 45, Howe scored 100 points during the season, and he was subsequently awarded the Gary L. Davidson Award for most valuable player. Two seasons after he won the award, it was renamed to honor his legacy. The Aeros won the Western Division for the first time in their history.

Final standings

Game log

Playoffs
The Aeros defeated the Winnipeg Jets in the Division semi-final 4–0. In the Division final, the Aeros defeated the Minnesota Fighting Saints 4–2 to advance to the Avco Cup final. The Aeros would sweep the Chicago Cougars to win their first WHA championship.

Houston Aeros 4, Winnipeg Jets 0 - Semifinals

Houston Aeros 4, Minnesota Fighting Saints 2 - Division Finals

Houston Aeros 4, Chicago Cougars 0 - Avco Cup Finals

Player stats

Note: Pos = Position; GP = Games played; G = Goals; A = Assists; Pts = Points; +/- = plus/minus; PIM = Penalty minutes; PPG = Power-play goals; SHG = Short-handed goals; GWG = Game-winning goals
      MIN = Minutes played; W = Wins; L = Losses; T = Ties; GA = Goals-against; GAA = Goals-against average; SO = Shutouts;

Awards and records

Transactions

Draft picks
Houston's draft picks at the 1973 WHA Amateur Draft.

See also
1973–74 WHA season

References

External links

Houston
Houston
Houston Aeros seasons